Uttecht v. Brown, 551 U.S. 1 (2007), was a case dealing with jury selection in capital cases in which the Supreme Court of the United States held that appeals courts must defer to a trial judge’s decision on whether a potential juror would be able to overcome demur about capital punishment and be open to voting to impose a death sentence.

Background and court history 
Cal Coburn Brown, who had an extensive criminal history involving violence against women, was convicted of carjacking a woman at knifepoint, holding her in a motel for 34 hours, raping, torturing and eventually murdering her, leaving her body in her car's trunk.  He was sentenced to death in a Washington State Court.  After his conviction was affirmed by state courts, Brown filed a petition for a writ of habeas corpus in federal district court, in which he argued in part that the state trial judge had improperly dismissed a juror without finding that the juror's views on capital punishment would impair his ability to follow the law. The district denied his petition and Brown appealed.

The 9th Circuit Court of Appeals reversed the lower court's ruling and upheld Brown's objections as valid finding that the judge's dismissal of the juror infringed upon clear Supreme Court precedent, and that said dismissal prejudiced the jury against the defendant, nullifying his death sentence.

Question 
The question before the Court was whether or not the 9th Circuit Court of Appeals had made an error by not deferring to the trial judge's observations concerning a prospective juror's views on capital punishment and by not applying the statutory presumption of correctness in ruling that the state court decision to remove a juror was contrary to clearly established federal law.

Opinion of the Supreme Court 
In a 5-4 conservative-liberal split the majority found that the 9th Circuit had indeed erred when they overruled the Washington State Court's decision and invalidated Brown's death sentence.  The precedents of Wainwright v. Witt, 469 U.S. 412 (1985), and Darden v. Wainwright, 447 U.S. 168 (1986), established that a state trial judge may, without presenting any explicit findings or conclusions, remove a juror for cause when the judge determines the juror's views on the death penalty would substantially limit his or her ability to follow the law and perform the duties of a juror. Justice Kennedy, writing for the majority, said that appeals courts must defer to a trial judge’s decision on whether a potential juror would be able to overcome qualms regarding the death penalty and be open to voting to impose execution as a sentence.

Dissent 
The dissenting opinion, joined by Justices Ginsburg, Souter and Breyer, and written by Justice Stevens expressed concern that the decision set the disqualification bar for prospective jurors too low and in effect could cause juries to be more likely to vote for a death sentence.

Subsequent events
, Brown remained on death row in Washington state. His execution, once scheduled for March 13, 2009, was stayed until September 2010, when the Thurston County Superior Court completed a review of the constitutionality of Washington's lethal injection procedures. The validity of Washington's lethal injection procedures and the competency of the staff administering these duties were upheld on September 7, 2010 and Brown's stay was lifted. Brown was executed on September 10, 2010, the first person executed in the state of Washington since 2001 and the last execution in Washington before capital punishment was ruled unconstitutional in the state in 2018.

See also
 List of most recent executions by jurisdiction
 List of people executed in Washington
 List of people executed in the United States in 2010
 List of United States Supreme Court cases
 List of United States Supreme Court cases, volume 551

References

External links
 

United States Supreme Court cases
United States death penalty case law
2007 in United States case law
Capital punishment in Washington (state)
United States Supreme Court cases of the Roberts Court
2007 in Washington (state)